The West Indies cricket team toured Australia in the 1984-85 season and played 5 Test matches against Australia.  West Indies won the series 3-1 with one match drawn. The West Indies won the first three Tests quite easily against a very weak Australian team. Then captain Kim Hughes lost the captaincy due to his and the Australian Cricket Team's poor form after the Second Test and Allan Border took over.  The Fourth Test at Melbourne ended West Indies' then world record of 11 consecutive Test wins as Australia held out for a draw.  West Indies lost the Fifth Test by an innings at Sydney where Clive Lloyd played the last of his 110 Tests.

Test series summary

First Test

Courtney Walsh was selected for his Test debut, and would go on to have a stellar career for the West Indies, taking over 500 wickets.

Midway through the opening day, it seemed like Kim Hughes' decision to field first was the right one. Two days of rain in Perth before the match had left the pitch unpredictable, and swing bowler Terry Alderman, playing in his first Test since his altercation with a pitch invader at the same ground two years before, took four wickets for five runs in 26 balls to have the West Indies at 104 for five, after Gordon Greenidge and Desmond Haynes had put together an opening partnership of 83. Jeff Dujon and Larry Gomes steadied the innings, leaving the West Indies at 211 for six at stumps on the first day. Dujon had actually taken a blow to the head from Alderman, and had to go off briefly due to complaints of blurred vision.

The pair batted all the way through until an hour after lunch on the second day, putting together 149 runs for the seventh wicket, before Dujon was caught behind off Alderman for a well-made 139 which included 21 fours. Gomes was the last man out, by which time he too had made a century (127) and the West Indies had scored 416.

Australia got off to a dreadful start, limping to 36 for three at the end of day two, and then collapsing to be all out for 76, their lowest ever innings against the West Indies. Michael Holding took six wickets in eight overs, his 13th haul of five or more wickets in an innings in Test cricket. The Australians were forced to follow on, and lost Kepler Wessels in the first over. John Dyson and Graeme Wood provided some resistance with a 90-run partnership. They were helped in some part by giant paceman Joel Garner, who was no-balled six times in one over! But after they were removed, the middle order again provided feeble resistance, and only a final wicket stand of 59 between Alderman and Geoff Lawson delayed the inevitable innings victory until early on the fourth day.

Second Test

Third Test

Fourth Test

Fifth Test

World Series Cup

West Indies went through the qualifying round of 10 matches unbeaten against Australia and Sri Lanka. The first final though was won by Australia, the West Indies fought back to win the second. This demoralised the Aussies as they easily lost the third.

References

External links
 CricketArchive – tour summaries

Further reading
 Chris Harte, A History of Australian Cricket, Andre Deutsch, 1993

1984 in Australian cricket
1984 in West Indian cricket
1984–85 Australian cricket season
1985 in Australian cricket
1985 in West Indian cricket
International cricket competitions from 1980–81 to 1985
1984-85